The Schaalsee Biosphere Reserve lies in western Mecklenburg-Vorpommern (districts of Nordwestmecklenburg and Ludwigslust-Parchim) on its border with Schleswig-Holstein. From 1952 to 1990 large parts of the Schaalsee landscape lay within the military out of bounds area of the Inner German Border. That state-imposed rest period enable nature to develop so that in the year 2000 this valuable area was designated as a biosphere reserve. On the Schleswig-Holstein side of the border is the Lauenburg Lakes Nature Park founded in 1961.

Introduced Rheas 
An escaped population of greater rhea have become established in the reserve, with several hundred birds in the area. Studies of their ecological effects are ongoing, though damage to crops has been reported.

Geography 
The biosphere reserve lies in a young moraine landscape formed in the Weichsel glaciation. To the east is the Baltic Uplands, pierced by the Trave, and which runs across the whole of Mecklenburg. In the lake of Schaalsee, that gives the reserve its name, are several islands including Kampenwerder, Stintenburginsel and Rethwiese.

Literature

References

External links 
 Ordinance about the designation of nature reserves and a protected landscape of central importance under the overall title of Schaalsee Biosphere Reserve dated 12 September 1990, last amended on 21 July 1998
 Office for the Schaalsee Biosphere Reserve
 Society for the Preservation of the Schaalsee Biosphere
 Stiftung Biosphäre Schaalsee
 M-V environmental map portal with geodata  (reser boundaries, biotope mapping, geotope etc.)

Biosphere reserves of Germany
Important Bird Areas of Germany
Ludwigslust-Parchim
Nature reserves in Mecklenburg-Western Pomerania